Jahadabad (also Romanized as Jahādābād; also known as Chādorābād) is a village in Cheshmeh Saran Rural District, Cheshmeh Saran District, Azadshahr County, Golestan Province, Iran. At the 2006 census, its population was 21, in 8 families.

References 

Populated places in Azadshahr County